Rovasenda railway station is one of two train stations, serving the comune of Rovasenda (situated in the mount part of hill), in the Piedmont region, northwestern Italy. The name "Alta" (High) has been assigned to distinguish by the station low. It is the junction of the Santhià–Arona. It also plays a role interchange with station Rovasenda (low) of line Biella–Novara.

The station is remained without traffic from 17 June 2012, because suspension of service on the railway, by decision of the Piedmont Region. The station was managed by Rete Ferroviaria Italiana (RFI). Train services were operated by Trenitalia.  Each of these companies is a subsidiary of Ferrovie dello Stato (FS), Italy's state-owned rail company.

History
The station was opened on 16 January 1905, upon the inauguration the first part of the Santhià–Arona railway, from Santhià to Borgomanero.

Features
Two tracks of which are equipped with platforms.

See also

 History of rail transport in Italy
 List of railway stations in Piedmont
 Rail transport in Italy
 Railway stations in Italy

References

External links

Rovasenda
Railway stations in Piedmont
Railway stations opened in 1905
1905 establishments in Italy
Railway stations in Italy opened in the 20th century